"I Don't Mind the Thorns (If You're the Rose)" is a song written by Jan Buckingham and Linda Young and recorded by American country music artist Lee Greenwood. It was released in July 1985 as the lead single from the album Streamline. The song was Greenwood's fourth number one on the country chart.  The single went to number one for one week and spent a total of fifteen weeks on the country chart.

Chart performance

References

1985 singles
Lee Greenwood songs
MCA Records singles
Song recordings produced by Jerry Crutchfield
1985 songs